First Man is a 2018 American biographical drama film directed by Damien Chazelle and written by Josh Singer. Based on the book First Man: The Life of Neil A. Armstrong by James R. Hansen, the film stars Ryan Gosling as Neil Armstrong, alongside  Claire Foy, Jason Clarke, Kyle Chandler, Corey Stoll, Ciarán Hinds, Christopher Abbott, Patrick Fugit, and Lukas Haas, and follows the years leading up to the Apollo 11 mission to the Moon in 1969. Steven Spielberg serves as an executive producer.

First Man had its world premiere at the Venice Film Festival on August 29, 2018, and was theatrically released in the United States on October 12, 2018, by Universal Pictures. The film received critical praise, particularly regarding the direction, Gosling and Foy's performances, musical score, and the Moon landing sequence, although its choice to not depict the planting of the American flag on the lunar surface led critics and politicians from both political parties to debate the film's stance on patriotism.  It grossed over $102 million worldwide against its $59 million production budget, and received numerous award nominations, including two nominations for Best Supporting Actress (Foy) and Best Original Score (winning the latter) at the 76th Golden Globe Awards and seven nominations at the 72nd British Academy Film Awards. The film also received Oscar nominations for Best Sound Mixing, Best Sound Editing, and Best Production Design, and it won for Best Visual Effects at the 91st Academy Awards.

Accolades

See also
 2018 in film

Notes

References

External links 
 

Lists of accolades by film